The Vosburgh Stakes is an American thoroughbred horse race held annually at Belmont Park in Elmont, New York. Run at the end of September/early October, it is open to horses three-years-old and up of either gender. A Grade II sprint race, it is raced at a distance of seven furlongs and is a major prep to the Breeders' Cup Sprint.

First run in 1940, the Vosburgh Stakes is named in honor of Walter Vosburgh, a turf historian who was the official handicapper for The Jockey Club and various other racing associations from 1894 to 1934. The inaugural race, as well as the second running, was won by Herbert M. Woolf's colt Joe Schenck, named for the vaudeville star, Joseph Thuma Schenck.

The race was run at Aqueduct Race Track in 1959, 1961 to 1974, 1976, 1977, 1979, 1983, 1985, and 1986. It was raced over a distance of seven furlongs from inception until 2003 when it was run at 6.5 furlongs for that year only. Since 2004 it has been run at its current distance of six furlongs.

Prior to 1979, it was called the Vosburgh Handicap. Until 1958 it was open to all ages.

As of 2020 the race was downgraded to Group II.

Records
Speed record: 
 1:08.02 @ 6 furlongs – Private Zone (2013)
 1:20.20 @ 7 furlongs – Dr. Fager (1968)

Most wins:
 2 – Joe Schenck (1940, 1941)
 2 – Dr. Fager (1967, 1968)
 2 – Sewickley (1989, 1990)
 2 – Private Zone (2013, 2014)
 2 – Imperial Hint (2018, 2019)

Most wins by a jockey:
 6 – Ángel Cordero Jr. (1973, 1978, 1983, 1984, 1987, 1990)

Most wins by a trainer:
 4 – Flint S. Schulhofer (1969, 1989, 1990, 1992)

Most wins by an owner:
 4 – Tartan Stable (1967, 1968, 1969, 1978)

Winners

 *In 1951 Miche finished first, but was disqualified.

References

External links
 The Vosburgh Stakes at Pedigree Query

Graded stakes races in the United States
Open sprint category horse races
Grade 1 stakes races in the United States
Horse races in New York (state)
Recurring sporting events established in 1940
Belmont Park
Sports in Long Island
Breeders' Cup Challenge series
1940 establishments in New York (state)